Greenhouse is American guitarist Leo Kottke's fifth album, his second on the Capitol label, released in 1972. It was recorded in three days. From the liner notes: "In the sense that my guitars were once plants, this record's a greenhouse.” There are seven instrumentals and four vocals. It reached No. 127 on the Billboard 200 chart.

It was re-issued on CD by One Way Records in 1995.

Reception

Writing for Allmusic, music critic Bruce Eder noted that the album was less ambitious that Kottke's previous release and wrote of the album "... Greenhouse is a true solo record that offers several surprises. Over a third of it is made up of vocal numbers, including two that are absolutely superb... Some of the mastering isn't quite as clean here as it is on other titles in Kottke's catalog, but otherwise this is an acceptable reissue of an album that is, perhaps, under appreciated because of its relatively high concentration of vocal numbers by the guitarist."

Track listing

Personnel
Leo Kottke – 6- & 12-string guitar, vocals
Steve Gammell – second guitar on "Lost John"

Production notes
Producer: Denny Bruce (Takoma Productions)
Recorded at Sound Eighty, Minneapolis, Minnesota
Engineer: Paul "Shorty" Martinson
Album Design: Good Time Graphix
Photography & Artwork: Bill Matthews

References

External links
Leo Kottke's official site
Unofficial Leo Kottke web site (fan site)
 The Capitol Years

1972 albums
Leo Kottke albums
Capitol Records albums
Albums produced by Denny Bruce